Charles Kellogg (January 12, 1940 – September 21, 2015) was an American cross-country skier. He competed in the men's 30 kilometre event at the 1968 Winter Olympics.

References

1940 births
2015 deaths
American male cross-country skiers
Olympic cross-country skiers of the United States
Cross-country skiers at the 1968 Winter Olympics
Sportspeople from Boston